Yan Gomes (born July 19, 1987) is a Brazilian-American professional baseball catcher for the Chicago Cubs of Major League Baseball (MLB). He previously played for the Toronto Blue Jays, Cleveland Indians, Washington Nationals and Oakland Athletics. The Blue Jays drafted Gomes in the tenth round of the 2009 MLB Draft. He made his MLB debut in 2012, becoming the first Brazilian-born player in major league history. He played for the Blue Jays in 2012 and the Indians from 2013 to 2018. He was traded to the Nationals ahead of the 2019 season and won the World Series with Washington over the Houston Astros.

Personal life
Gomes was born in Mogi das Cruzes, Brazil. His mother, Claudia, moved the family to the United States after getting a job in Florida, and his father, Décio, is a tennis instructor. He was introduced to baseball by a Cuban coach his father met in São Paulo. Gomes' family moved to the United States when he was 12.

Gomes married Jenna Hammaker, daughter of former pitcher and All-Star Atlee Hammaker, in 2012. They have three children, a daughter born in 2014 and sons born in 2017 and 2021. They reside in Knoxville, Tennessee.

Career

Amateur career
Gomes attended Miami Southridge High School in Miami, Florida, where he played for the school's baseball team. He enrolled at the University of Tennessee, where he played college baseball for the Tennessee Volunteers in the Southeastern Conference of the National Collegiate Athletic Association's (NCAA) Division I. At Tennessee, he started at every infield position except shortstop. He also spent a season as J. P. Arencibia's backup at catcher. After his first season with Tennessee, he was named an NCAA Division I Freshman All-American. In 2007, he played collegiate summer baseball for the Cotuit Kettleers of the Cape Cod Baseball League, and returned to the league in 2008 to play for the Chatham A's.

Gomes was drafted by the Boston Red Sox in the 39th round of the 2008 Major League Baseball (MLB) Draft, but he did not sign. After playing two seasons with the Volunteers, Gomes transferred to Barry University, where he continued his collegiate career with the Barry Buccaneers in the Sunshine State Conference. He set school records with 92 runs batted in (RBI) and 172 total bases. He was named to the All-South regional team, and he was honored as the All-South player of the year and an All-American. After his junior season, the Toronto Blue Jays drafted Gomes in the tenth round of the 2009 MLB Draft, and he signed.

Professional career

Toronto Blue Jays
Gomes made his professional debut with the Gulf Coast Blue Jays of the Rookie-level Gulf Coast League in 2009. He was promoted to the Auburn Doubledays of the Class A-Short Season New York–Pennsylvania League that season. In 2010, he played for the Lansing Lugnuts of the Class A Midwest League and Dunedin Blue Jays of the Class A-Advanced Florida State League. Gomes played most of the 2011 season with the New Hampshire Fisher Cats of the Class AA Eastern League, receiving a brief promotion to the Las Vegas 51s of the Class AAA Pacific Coast League. During his first three professional seasons, Gomes spent most of his time as a backup catcher, but he soon began to receive playing time at first base and third base as well, as he sat behind top catching prospect Travis d'Arnaud in the organization's depth chart.

After batting .359 (47-for-131) with five home runs and 22 RBI at the start of the 2012 season with Las Vegas, Gomes was promoted on May 17, 2012 as the Blue Jays optioned the struggling Adam Lind to Las Vegas. Upon his MLB debut that day, Gomes became the first Brazilian player in MLB history. On the same day, Gomes got his first MLB hit, a single off of New York Yankees pitcher Phil Hughes. On May 18, 2012, Gomes hit his first MLB home run on the first pitch off of New York Mets pitcher Jon Niese in a 14–5 win. Gomes was optioned back to Las Vegas on May 27. He hit 5–22 with two home runs in eight games. Gomes was recalled from Triple-A on June 5, with pitcher Jesse Chavez being optioned to make room for him. Gomes was sent back down to Triple-A Las Vegas 51s on June 20. Gomes was again recalled from Triple-A Las Vegas 51s on July 19; pitcher Sam Dyson was optioned to Double-A New Hampshire Fisher Cats to make room on the roster.
Gomes was optioned back to the Las Vegas 51s after an 11–2 loss to the Texas Rangers on August 19.
Gomes was recalled to the Blue Jays active roster on September 7 after the Las Vegas 51s season ended.

Cleveland Indians
On November 3, 2012, the Blue Jays announced that they had traded Gomes and Mike Avilés to the Cleveland Indians for Esmil Rogers.  The Indians recalled Gomes from the Triple-A Columbus Clippers on April 9, 2013.  Gomes' first hit as an Indian was a 2-run HR on April 13, 2013 against the Chicago White Sox. Gomes was returned to Columbus on April 24 when Lou Marson came off the disabled list.  He was brought back up on April 28 when Marson was returned to the disabled list. On July 30, 2013, Gomes faced André Rienzo, the first Brazilian pitcher in MLB history. He finished 1–2 with a walk and a single off Rienzo.
Gomes and the Indians finalized a six-year, $23 million extension on March 31, 2014.

In 2014, he batted .278/.313/.472, winning the Silver Slugger award among American League catchers. In 2015 he batted .231/.267/.391.	

In 2016 he batted .167/.201/.327. He had the lowest batting average against right-handers among all MLB hitters (140 or more plate appearances), at .127.

On August 9, 2017, Yan Gomes hit a walk-off 3-run home run against Colorado Rockies in a 4-1 win, which was his second walk-off home run in his career. In 2017 he batted .232/.309/.399.

Batting .251 with ten home runs and 31 RBIs, Gomes was named to the 2018 MLB All-Star Game. He became the first Brazilian player to be featured in an All-Star Game in an American sports league. In 2018 he batted .266/.313/.449.

Washington Nationals
On November 30, 2018, Gomes was traded to the Washington Nationals for right-handed pitcher Jefry Rodríguez, minor league outfielder Daniel Johnson, and a player to be named later, later announced as Andruw Monasterio. In 2019 he batted .223/.316/.389 with 12 home runs and 43 RBIs, and won the World Series title, catching the final out of the series-clinching Game 7, which was a Daniel Hudson strikeout of Michael Brantley. The Nationals declined a club option for $9 million to keep Gomes for the 2020 season, making him a free agent. On December 10, 2019, Gomes re-signed with Washington on a two-year contract. In the shortened 2020 season, Gomes batted .284/.319/.468 with 4 home runs and 13 RBIs in 30 games.

Oakland Athletics
On July 30, 2021, Gomes was traded to the Oakland Athletics along with Josh Harrison in exchange for Drew Millas, Richard Guasch, and Seth Shuman.

Chicago Cubs
On December 1, 2021, Gomes signed a two-year contract with a club option for 2024 with the Chicago Cubs.

World Baseball Classic
Gomes helped the Brazilian national team qualify for its first ever berth in the World Baseball Classic by leading them out of the 2013 World Baseball Classic qualifying round. Gomes was the only Major Leaguer on Brazil's team for the qualifiers and helped his team advance despite the other teams in the pool at the time boasting several Major Leaguers. He opted not to participate in the 2013 World Baseball Classic to focus on winning a spot on the Indians' Opening Day roster.

References

External links

Tennessee Volunteers bio

1987 births
Living people
American League All-Stars
Auburn Doubledays players
Brazilian expatriate baseball players in Canada
Brazilian expatriate baseball players in the United States
Barry Buccaneers baseball players
Chatham Anglers players
Chicago Cubs players
Cleveland Indians players
Columbus Clippers players
Cotuit Kettleers players
Dunedin Blue Jays players
Gulf Coast Blue Jays players
Lansing Lugnuts players
Las Vegas 51s players
Major League Baseball catchers
Major League Baseball first basemen
Major League Baseball players from Brazil
Major League Baseball third basemen
New Hampshire Fisher Cats players
Oakland Athletics players
Phoenix Desert Dogs players
Sportspeople from São Paulo
Baseball players from Miami
Silver Slugger Award winners
Tennessee Volunteers baseball players
Toros del Este players
Brazilian expatriate baseball players in the Dominican Republic
Toronto Blue Jays players
Washington Nationals players
Miami Southridge Senior High School alumni
Brazilian American